Eric Lee Zomalt (born August 9, 1972) is a former American football safety in the National Football League. He was drafted by the Philadelphia Eagles in the third round of the 1994 NFL Draft and played for the team from 1994−1996. He played for the New York Jets in 1996. He played college football at California.

Early years
Zomalt attended Canyon Springs High School in Moreno Valley, California. In 1989, Zomalt was named CIF Division 5 Player of the Year and state 2A Player of the Year in football.

College career
Zomalt started at safety for the University of California Golden Bears.

Professional career
Zomalt was selected by the Philadelphia Eagles in the third round (103rd overall) of the 1994 NFL Draft. Against the Oakland Raiders in 1995, Zomalt started in his first game after Mike Zordich became injured. He became the starting free safety for the Eagles to begin the 1996 season, but the play of rookie Brian Dawkins forced the coaching staff to bench him after two weeks. Zomalt was released on September 18, 1996. He was quickly signed by the New York Jets the same day. Zomalt started one game for the Jets at free safety, the season finale against the Miami Dolphins. After the 1996 season, Zomalt became a restricted free agent, but the Jets did not extend a qualifying offer to him, making him an unrestricted free agent. He did not sign with another team after his stint with the Jets.

Coaching career
Zomalt and his brother, Greg, coached together at San Leandro High School in San Leandro, California, Moreno Valley High School, Canyon Springs High School, and Citrus Hill High School in Perris, California, where Zomalt has been the head coach since 2010.

References

1972 births
Living people
People from Moreno Valley, California
American football safeties
California Golden Bears football players
Philadelphia Eagles players
New York Jets players
Players of American football from Los Angeles
People from Perris, California